Barmen may refer to:

People
Kristoffer Barmen, a Norwegian professional footballer who plays for Brann

Places
Barmen, a municipal subdivision of the German city of Wuppertal
Barmen or Barmøya, an island in Stad municipality in Vestland county, Norway
Barmen, Agder, an island in Risør municipality in Agder county, Norway
Gross Barmen, a settlement in Namibia

Other
 118173 Barmen, a main-belt asteroid
 Barmen Declaration, a statement of the Confessing Church opposing the Nazi-supported "German-Christian" movement
 SSV Barmen, a German association football club from Barmen in the city of Wuppertal
 Barmen lace machine 
 Plural form of barman

See also
 Barman (disambiguation)